Buzz Slutzky (born 1988) is an artist, writer, educator, and performer who works in Brooklyn.

Early life and education 
Slutzky was born in Overland Park, Kansas in 1988 and grew up in Maplewood, New Jersey. Slutzky identifies as a white Ashkenazi Jew and a non-binary transgender person, using they/them pronouns. They were raised in an upper middle class family, the second child of Richard Slutzky of Omaha, Nebraska and Allison Slutzky of Fort Worth, Texas. Their older brother Dane is also transgender.

They graduated with a Bachelor in Arts from Sarah Lawrence College in 2010, and their Masters in Fine Arts at Parsons the New School for Design in 2015. They have taught courses in art practice and theory at SUNY Purchase College and CUNY College of Staten Island, and the Leslie-Lohman Museum of Art.

Work 
Slutzky has made work at the intersection of performance, craft, and figuration and has shown at the Leslie Lohman Museum of Art, New York, NY, Institute of Contemporary Art at the University of Pennsylvania, Philadelphia, PA, and Smithsonian American Art Museum, Washington, D.C.

References

1988 births
American artists
American Ashkenazi Jews
Jewish American artists
Living people
Non-binary artists
People from Brooklyn
People from Maplewood, New Jersey
People from Overland Park, Kansas
Transgender Jews
LGBT people from Kansas
LGBT people from New Jersey
Transgender artists
21st-century American Jews
21st-century LGBT people